The index of physics articles is split into multiple pages due to its size.

To navigate by individual letter use the table of contents below.

M

M-theory
M-theory simplified
M. J. Whelan
M. C. Joshi
M. G. K. Menon
M. J. Seaton
M. Jamal Deen
M. King Hubbert
M. P. Parameswaran
M. Shamsher Ali
M. Vijayan
M. Yousuff Hussaini
M82 X-1
MAJORANA
MARIACHI
MAUD Committee
MAX-lab
MAX IV
MCP-RHEED
MELCOR
MEMO Model
MERLIN
MERLIN reactor
MHD generator
MINDO
MINERνA
MINOS
MIRACL
MIT Center for Theoretical Physics
MIT Plasma Science and Fusion Center
ML-1
MNDO
MNS matrix
MOATA
MOCADI
MODTRAN
MOPAC
MOX fuel
MPC&A
MPRG Erlangen Division 3
MSSM Higgs mass
MSU Faculty of Physics
MUSCL scheme
MacCormack method
MacDowell–Mansouri action
Macedonio Melloni
Mach's principle
Mach bands
Mach number
Mach principle
Mach reflection
Mach tuck
Mach wave
Mache (unit)
Macromolecular Chemistry and Physics
Macromolecular Rapid Communications
Macropore
Macroscopic quantum self-trapping
Macroscopic quantum phenomena
Macroscopic quantum self-trapping
Macroscopic quantum state
Macroscopic scale
Macrosonics
Madelung constant
Madelung equations
Madison Symmetric Torus
Magdeburg hemispheres
Maggie Aderin-Pocock
Magic angle
Magic angle spinning
Magic number (physics)
Maglev wind turbine
Magnecule
Magnesium diboride
Magnet
Magnet wire
Magnetar
Magnetic Prandtl number
Magnetic Resonance in Medicine
Magnetic Reynolds number
Magnetic anisotropy
Magnetic anomaly detector
Magnetic braking
Magnetic capacitance
Magnetic capacitivity
Magnetic circuit
Magnetic circular dichroism
Magnetic complex impedance
Magnetic confinement fusion
Magnetic damping
Magnetic deviation
Magnetic diffusivity
Magnetic dip
Magnetic dipole
Magnetic dipole–dipole interaction
Magnetic domain
Magnetic effective resistance
Magnetic energy
Magnetic evaporative cooling
Magnetic field
Magnetic field intensity
Magnetic field viewing film
Magnetic flow meter
Magnetic flux
Magnetic flux quantum
Magnetic force microscope
Magnetic form factor
Magnetic helicity
Magnetic hyperthermia
Magnetic impedance
Magnetic impurity
Magnetic inductance
Magnetic inductive coil
Magnetic ionic liquid
Magnetic isotope effect
Magnetic lattice (accelerator)
Magnetic lens
Magnetic levitation
Magnetic mirror
Magnetic mirror point
Magnetic moment
Magnetic monopole
Magnetic nanoparticles
Magnetic particle imaging
Magnetic photon
Magnetic pole strength
Magnetic pressure
Magnetic properties
Magnetic property
Magnetic quantum number
Magnetic reactance
Magnetic reconnection
Magnetic refrigeration
Magnetic reluctance
Magnetic resonance force microscopy
Magnetic resonance imaging
Magnetic sail
Magnetic scalar potential
Magnetic semiconductor
Magnetic separation
Magnetic structure
Magnetic susceptibility
Magnetic tension force
Magnetic translation
Magnetic vector potential
Magnetic water treatment
Magnetism
Magnetization
Magnetization dynamics
Magnetization reversal by circularly polarized light
Magnetization transfer
Magnetized target fusion
Magneto-optic Kerr effect
Magneto-optic effect
Magneto-optical trap
Magnetoception
Magnetochemistry
Magnetocrystalline anisotropy
Magnetogastrography
Magnetogram
Magnetogravitic tensor
Magnetogravity wave
Magnetohydrodynamic drive
Magnetohydrodynamics
Magnetohydrodynamics (journal)
Magnetometer
Magnetomotive force
Magnetopause
Magnetoresistance
Magnetorheological finishing
Magnetorheological fluid
Magnetorotational instability
Magnetosome
Magnetosphere
Magnetosphere chronology
Magnetosphere of Jupiter
Magnetosphere particle motion
Magnetospheric electric convection field
Magnetospheric eternally collapsing object
Magnetostatics
Magnetostriction
Magnetotactic bacteria
Magnetotaxis
Magnifying transmitter
Magnitude (astronomy)
Magnon
Magnonics
Magnus effect
Mahmoud Hessabi
Mains hum
Mainz Microtron
Major actinide
Majorana Prize
Majorana equation
Majorana fermion
Majoron
Majumdar–Ghosh model
Maki–Nakagawa–Sakata matrix
Makoto Kobayashi (physicist)
Malament–Hogarth spacetime
Malcolm Beasley
Malcolm Perry (physicist)
Malleability
Malter effect
Mandelstam variables
Mandrel wrapping
Manfred R. Schroeder
Manfred Wagner
Manfred von Ardenne
Manhattan Project
Mani Lal Bhaumik
Manifest covariance
Manipulation of atoms by optical field
Manne Siegbahn
Manning formula
Mannque Rho
Mantle convection
Manuel António Gomes
Manuel Mateus Ventura
Manuel Sandoval Vallarta
Many-body problem
Many-body theory
Many-worlds interpretation
Marangoni effect
Marangoni number
Marc-Auguste Pictet
Marc A. Kastner
Marc Henneaux
Marcel Audiffren
Marcel Brillouin
Marcel Grossmann
Marcel J. E. Golay
Marcel Schein
Marcela Carena
Marcello Pirani
Marcelo Damy
Marcelo Gleiser
Marchenko equation
Marcia McNutt
Marcia Neugebauer
Marcos Moshinsky
Marcus Birkenkrahe
Marcus O'Day
Marek Gazdzicki
Marek Huberath
Margaret Eliza Maltby
Margaret Geller
Margaret Hamilton (scientist)
Margaret MacVicar
Margaret Murnane
Margaret Wertheim
Margherita Hack
Marginal stability
Margolus–Levitin theorem
Marguerite Perey
Maria Ardinghelli
Maria Goeppert-Mayer
Maria Spiropulu
Marian Danysz
Marian Smoluchowski
Mariano Gago
Marie Alfred Cornu
Marie Curie
Marietta Blau
Marijan Šunjić (physicist)
Marin (wind)
Marin Getaldić
Marin Soljačić
Mario Acuña
Mario Ageno
Mario Bunge
Mario Garavaglia
Mario Livio
Mariotte's bottle
Maritime Research Institute Netherlands
Marjorie Williamson
Mark Adler
Mark B. Wise
Mark Birkinshaw
Mark Boslough
Mark Buchanan
Mark D. Maughmer
Mark G. Kuzyk
Mark G. Raizen
Mark I (detector)
Mark Inghram
Mark Muir Mills
Mark Newman
Mark Oliphant
Mark Reed (physicist)
Mark Trodden
Mark Welland
Markus Aspelmeyer
Markus Greiner
Marlan Scully
Marshall Rosenbluth
Marshall Stoneham
Martin A. Pomerantz
Martin A. Uman
Martin Bojowald
Martin David Kruskal
Martin Deutsch
Martin Gutzwiller
Martin Knudsen
Martin Kutta
Martin Lewis Perl
Martin Lowry
Martin Pope
Martin Rees
Martin Rocek
Martin Ryle
Martin Schadt
Martin Tajmar
Martin Walt
Martin van Marum
Martinus J. G. Veltman
Marvin D. Girardeau
Marvin L. Cohen
Marvin Leonard Goldberger
Mary K. Gaillard
Masatoshi Koshiba
Masatsugu Suzuki
Masayuki Kikuchi
Maser
Mason equation
Mass
Mass-to-charge ratio
Mass attenuation coefficient
Mass chromatogram
Mass concentration (astronomy)
Mass distribution
Mass flow
Mass flow meter
Mass flow rate
Mass flow sensor
Mass flux
Mass gap
Mass generation
Mass in general relativity
Mass in special relativity
Mass matrix
Mass number
Mass properties
Mass ratio
Mass segregation
Mass spectrometry
Mass spectrometry data format
Mass spectrum
Mass transfer
Massimo Porrati
Massive compact halo object
Massive gravity
Massive particle
Massless particle
Mass–energy equivalence
Mass–luminosity relation
Master equation
Masud Ahmad
Material derivative
Material dispersion coefficient
Material physics
Material point method
Material properties (thermodynamics)
Materials (journal)
Materials Chemistry and Physics
Materials Research Science and Engineering Centers
Materials Science Citation Index
Materials Science and Engineering R
Materials and Structures
Materials science
Materials testing reactor
Mathematical descriptions of opacity
Mathematical descriptions of physical laws
Mathematical descriptions of the electromagnetic field
Mathematical formulation of quantum mechanics
Mathematical models in physics
Mathematical physics
Mathematical universe hypothesis
Mathematics of general relativity
Mathias Fink
Mathieu transformation
Matrix-assisted laser desorption/ionization
Matrix isolation
Matrix mechanics
Matrix string theory
Matrix theory (physics)
Mats Hillert
Mattauch isobar rule
Matter
Matter-dominated era
Matter wave
Matthew Kleban
Matthew Koss
Matthew Luckiesh
Matthew Sands
Matthias Staudacher
Mattis–Bardeen theory
Matvei Petrovich Bronstein
Maupertuis' principle
Maurice Allais
Maurice Anthony Biot
Maurice Couette
Maurice Ewing
Maurice Goldhaber
Maurice Hill (geophysicist)
Maurice Karnaugh
Maurice Pryce
Maurice Wilkes
Maurice Wilkins
Maurice de Broglie
Mauritius Renninger
Maw-Kuen Wu
Max Abraham
Max Born
Max Born Award
Max Cosyns
Max Delbrück
Max G. Lagally
Max Jammer
Max Krook
Max Perutz
Max Planck
Max Planck Institute for Biophysics
Max Planck Institute of Microstructure Physics
Max Planck Institute for Nuclear Physics
Max Planck Institute for the Science of Light
Max Planck Institute of Plasma Physics
Max Planck Medal
Max Q
Max Steenbeck
Max Tegmark
Max Trautz
Max Valier
Max Wien
Max von Laue
Maximilian Hell
Maximilien Toepler
Maximum bubble pressure method
Maximum density
Maximum entropy probability distribution
Maximum entropy thermodynamics
Maximum power transfer theorem
Maximum sustained wind
Maximus von Imhof
Maxwell's demon
Maxwell's equations
Maxwell's equations in curved spacetime
Maxwell's thermodynamic surface
Maxwell–Bloch equations
Maxwell bridge
Maxwell coil
Maxwell construction
Maxwell material
Maxwell relations
Maxwell speed distribution
Maxwell stress tensor
Maxwell–Boltzmann distribution
Maxwell–Boltzmann statistics
Maxwell–Stefan diffusion
Maxwell–Wagner–Sillars polarization
Mayak
Mazuku
McCumber relation
McLeod gauge
McStas
Mean anomaly
Mean field theory
Mean flow
Mean free path
Mean free time
Mean inter-particle distance
Mean radiant temperature
Measure-preserving dynamical system
Measure (physics)
Measurement
Measurement Science and Technology
Measurement in quantum mechanics
Measurement problem
Measurement uncertainty
Measurements of neutrino speed
Mechanical advantage
Mechanical efficiency
Mechanical energy
Mechanical equilibrium
Mechanical equivalent of heat
Mechanical explanations of gravitation
Mechanical filter
Mechanical metamaterial
Mechanical probe station
Mechanical resonance
Mechanical similarity
Mechanical singularity
Mechanical splice
Mechanical traveller
Mechanical wave
Mechanician
Mechanics
Mechanics of planar particle motion
Mechanics of structures
Mechanoluminescence
Mediator family
Medical physics
Medical radiography
Medical ultrasonography
Medium Energy Ion Scattering Facility
Medium frequency
MeerKAT
Mega Ampere Spherical Tokamak
Megalethoscope
Megasonic cleaning
Megatsunami
Megavoltage X-rays
Meghnad Saha
Mehdi Golshani
Mehran Kardar
Meinhard E. Mayer
Meissner effect
Meissner state
Meissner–Ochsenfeld effect
Meitner–Hupfeld effect
Melba Phillips
Melde's experiment
Melissa Franklin
Melting
Melting point
Melville S. Green
Melvin B. Gottlieb
Melvin Lax
Melvin Mooney
Melvin Schwartz
Membrane-introduction mass spectrometry
Membrane (M-theory)
Membrane analogy
Membrane mirror
Membrane paradigm
Memristor
Menas Kafatos
Mendel Sachs
Mendeleev's predicted elements
Meniscus (liquid)
Menyhért Palágyi
Mercury-in-glass thermometer
Mercury laser
Merle Randall
Merle Tuve
Mermin–Wagner theorem
Meron (physics)
Merrill Skolnik
Meshfree methods
Mesocrystal
Mesogen
Meson
Meson spectroscopy
Mesonic molecule
Mesoscopic
Mesoscopic physics
Mesoscopic scale
Meta-material cloak
Meta-materials cloak
Meta material
Meta materials
Metadynamics
Metafluid dynamics
Metal
Metal-induced gap states
Metal K-edge
Metal L-edge
Metalizing
Metallic crystal
Metallic hydrogen
Metallic microlattice
Metallicity
Metallizing
Metal–insulator transition
Metamagnetism
Metamaterial
Metamaterial absorber
Metamaterial antenna
Metamaterial antennas
Metamaterial cloaking
Metamaterial cloaking device
Metamaterial cloaking devices
Metamaterial cover
Metamaterial invisibility
Metamaterial lens
Metamaterial microwave cloak
Metamaterials
Metamaterials: Physics and Engineering Explorations
Metamaterials: physics and engineering explorations
Metamaterials: physics and engineering explorations.
Metamaterials (journal)
Metamaterials Handbook
Metamaterials cloak
Metamaterials cloaking
Metamaterials cloaking device
Metamaterials cloaking devices
Metamaterials invisibility
Metamaterials physics and engineering explorations
Metamaterials physics and engineering explorations.
Metastability
Meteoritical Society
Meteorology
Meteosat visible and infrared imager
Meteotsunami
Metering pump
Methane clathrate
Method of characteristics
Method of image charges
Method of images
Methods of detecting extrasolar planets
Metre per second squared
Metric expansion of space
Metric signature
Metric system
Metric tensor (general relativity)
Metrogon
Metrologia
Metropolis light transport
Michael A. O'Keefe
Michael Aizenman
Michael Atiyah
Michael Berry (physicist)
Michael Coey
Michael Creutz
Michael Duff (physicist)
Michael F. Shlesinger
Michael Faraday
Michael Fisher
Michael Foale
Michael Green (physicist)
Michael H. Hart
Michael Heller (professor/priest)
Michael Hochberg
Michael Kelly (physicist)
Michael L. W. Thewalt
Michael Levitt
Max Munk
Michael McKubre
Michael Pepper
Michael Perrin
Michael Peskin
Michael R. Anastasio
Michael R. Douglas
Michael Radaković
Michael Rossmann
Michael Rowan-Robinson
Michael S. Longuet-Higgins
Michael Schoenberg
Michael Tinkham
Michael Turner (cosmologist)
Michael Woolfson
Michal Lipson
Michał Heller
Michał Horodecki
Michel Ter-Pogossian
Michel parameters
Michele Besso
Michele Mosca
Michele Parrinello
Michelson interferometer
Michelson stellar interferometer
Michelson–Gale–Pearson experiment
Michelson–Morley experiment
Michiel B.M. van der Klis
Michio Kaku
Micro-g environment
Micro-pulling-down
MicroFUN
MicroMegas detector
Micro SPIDER
Micro black hole
Micro perforated plate
Microactuator
Microbarom
Microbarometer
Microbolometer
Microburst
Microcanonical ensemble
Microchannel plate detector
Microcosm (CERN)
Microelectromechanical system oscillator
Microfluidics
Microlensing Observations in Astrophysics
Microlift glider
Micromagnetics
Microphotonics
Microphysics
Microplasticity
Microquasar
Microrheology
Microscope
Microscopic scale
Microscopy Society of America
Microstate (statistical mechanics)
Microstate continuum
Microtron
Microviscosity
Microvoid coalescence
Microwave
Microwave-metamaterial cloak
Microwave Imaging Radiometer with Aperture Synthesis
Microwave Theory and Techniques, IEEE Transactions on
Microwave and Guided Wave Letters
Microwave and Guided Wave Letters, IEEE
Microwave and Optical Technology Letters
Microwave engineering
Microwave link
Microwave metamaterial cloak
Microwave plasma
Microwave power transmission
Microwave radio relay
Microwave radiometer
Microwave transmission
Mictomagnetism
Middle World
Mie scattering
Mieczysław Wolfke
Migma
Miguel A. Fernández Sanjuán
Miguel Alcubierre
Miguel Ángel Virasoro (physicist)
Miguel José Yacamán
Mihail Roco
Mihajlo Idvorski Pupin
Mihalis Dafermos
Mike Morris (physicist)
Mikhail Kovalchuk
Mikhail Lavrentyev
Mikhail Lomonosov
Mikhail Molodenskii
Mikhail Ostrogradsky
Mikhail Sadovsky
Mikhail Shifman
Mikhail Shultz
Mikheyev–Smirnov–Wolfenstein effect
Milagro (experiment)
Milan Damnjanović (physicist)
Milan Kurepa
Milan Vukcevich
Mild-slope equation
Mildred Allen
Mildred Dresselhaus
Milesian school
Mileva Marić
Millennium Prize Problems
Millennium Run
Miller index
Millisecond pulsar
Milne model
Miloslav Valouch
Milton A. Rothman
Milton Feng
Milton S. Livingston
Milton S. Plesset
Milton Van Dyke
Milutin Milanković
Mineral physics
Minh Quang Tran
Mini-magnetospheric plasma propulsion
MiniBooNE
MiniGrail
Miniature neutron source reactor
Minimal Supersymmetric Standard Model
Minimal models
Minimal subtraction scheme
Minimum Ionizing Particle
Minimum audibility curve
Minimum deviation
Minimum total potential energy principle
Minkowski diagram
Minkowski space
Minkowski–Bouligand dimension
Minority interpretations of quantum mechanics
Minto wheel
Minuano
Minute Physics
Mioara Mugur-Schächter
Mir (lens)
Mirage of astronomical objects
Mirau interferometer
Miroslav Žamboch
Mirror
Mirror Fusion Test Facility
Mirror furnace
Mirror matter
Mirror photon
Mirror symmetry (string theory)
Misalignment mechanism
Misner space
Missile Datcom
Missing energy
Mist
Mistral (wind)
Misznay–Schardin effect
Mitchell Feigenbaum
Mitsutaka Fujita
Mixed/dual cycle
Mixed anomaly
Mixed dark matter
Mixing (physics)
Mixing length model
Mixing paradox
Mixing ratio
Mixmaster dynamics
Mixmaster universe
Mixture theory
Mm'-type filter
MoEDAL experiment
MoL
Mobile Anisotropy Telescope
Mode-locking
Mode-stirred chamber
Mode volume
Model building (particle physics)
Model photosphere
Model solid approximation
Modelling and Simulation in Materials Science and Engineering
Modern Physics and Ancient Faith
Modern physics
Modern searches for Lorentz violation
Modified Newtonian dynamics
Modified models of gravity
Modular Neutron Array
Modular invariance
Modular ocean model
Modulated ultrasound
Modulation sphere
Modulational instability
Moduli (physics)
Moens–Korteweg equation
Moffat distribution
Mohammad Aslam Khan Khalil
Mohammad Khorrami (physicist)
Mohr's circle
Mohsen Fakhrizadeh-Mahabadi
Moire deflectometry
Moiré pattern
Moisey Markov
Moisture sorption isotherm
Mole (unit)
Molecular Hamiltonian
Molecular Physics (journal)
Molecular beam
Molecular beam epitaxy
Molecular chaos
Molecular diffusion
Molecular dipole moment
Molecular dynamics
Molecular electronic transducers
Molecular field
Molecular mechanics
Molecular motor
Molecular orbital
Molecular physics
Molecular radiation
Molecular scale electronics
Molecular sieve
Molecular tagging velocimetry
Molecular term symbol
Molecular vibration
Molecule
Molecule-based magnets
Molière radius
Molniya orbit
Molten-Salt Reactor Experiment
Molten salt reactor
Moment (physics)
Moment map
Moment of inertia
Momentum
Momentum diffusion
Momentum operator
Momentum space
Momentum theory
Momentum thickness
Momentum transfer
Monatomic gas
Monin–Obukhov length
Monochromatic electromagnetic plane wave
Monoclinic crystal system
Monocular
Monoisotopic mass
Monolayer
Monopole, Astrophysics and Cosmic Ray Observatory
Monster (physics)
Monte Carlo N-Particle Transport Code
Monte Carlo method
Monte Carlo method in statistical physics
Montonen–Olive duality
Montreal Laboratory
Moo-Young Han
Moody chart
Moon dog
Moonbow
Mooney–Rivlin solid
Moonlight
Mordehai Milgrom
Morikazu Toda
Morison equation
Morphology-dependent resonance
Morse potential
Morten Bo Madsen
Morton Gurtin
Morton number
Moseley's law
Moses Blackman
Moses H. W. Chan
Moshe Shapiro
Motion-triggered contact insufficiency
Motion (physics)
Motion graphs and derivatives
Motional narrowing
Motionless electromagnetic generator
Motonori Matuyama
Mott insulator
Mott problem
Mott scattering
Mott transition
Mottness
Mousetrap car
Moving frame
Moving magnet and conductor problem
Moving shock
Moyal bracket
Mpemba effect
Mu problem
Mueller calculus
Muffin-tin approximation
Muhammad Hafeez Qureshi
Multi-angle light scattering
Multi-configuration time-dependent Hartree
Multi-configurational self-consistent field
Multi-object APO Radial Velocity Exoplanet Large-area Survey
Multi-wavelength anomalous dispersion
Multiangle light scattering
Multiferroics
Multipaction
Multipactor effect
Multipath interference
Multiphase flow
Multiphoton lithography
Multiphysics
Multiphysics Methods Group
Multiple-scale analysis
Multiple histories
Multiple isomorphous replacement
Multiplet
Multiplicative quantum number
Multipole expansion
Multipole moment
Multipurpose Applied Physics Lattice Experiment
Multiscale modeling
Multiverse
Muneer Ahmad Rashid
Munir Ahmad Khan
Munir Nayfeh
Munroe effect
Muon
Muon-catalyzed fusion
Muon capture
Muon collider
Muon neutrino
Muonium
Murray Batchelor
Murray Gell-Mann
Museum of Optical Technologies
Mushroom cloud
Musical acoustics
My Inventions: The Autobiography of Nikola Tesla
Myriam Sarachik
Myron L. Good
Myron Samuel Malkin
Mysterious duality
Mária Telkes
Mário Schenberg
Mössbauer effect
Mössbauer spectroscopy
Møller scattering
Mārcis Auziņš

Indexes of physics articles